Panagiotis Karatzas (born June 29, 1965 in Athens, Greece) is a retired Greek professional basketball player.

Professional career
During his pro club career, Karatzas was an important member of the Greek club Pagrati, where he played from 1983 to 1990. After that, he played with the Greek club Olympiacos, from 1990 to 1994. With Olympiacos, he won the Greek League championship in 1993 and 1994, and the Greek Cup title in 1994. In 1995, he returned to Pagrati. He finished his career with the Greek club Agiou Thoma Goudi.

National team career
Karatzas was a member of the Greece men's national basketball team that played at the 1986 FIBA World Championship. The Greece men's national basketball team won the gold medal at the 1987 EuroBasket.

References

External links 
FIBA Archive Profile
FIBA Europe Profile
Hellenic Basketball Federation Profile 

1965 births
1986 FIBA World Championship players
Living people
Centers (basketball)
Greek Basket League players
Greek men's basketball players
Olympiacos B.C. players
Pagrati B.C. players
Power forwards (basketball)
Basketball players from Athens